Francis Scully (1820  – 18 August 1864), was an Irish politician in the United Kingdom House of Commons.

Scully was elected to the United Kingdom House of Commons as Member of Parliament for Tipperary in 1847, and held the seat until 1857.

References

External links 
 

    
    
    

1820 births
1864 deaths
Members of the Parliament of the United Kingdom for County Tipperary constituencies (1801–1922)
UK MPs 1847–1852
UK MPs 1852–1857
19th-century Irish people
Irish Repeal Association MPs